Henry Pratt may refer to:

 Henry Cheever Pratt (1803–1880), American artist and explorer
 Henry Lark Pratt (1805–1873), English artist
 Henry Conger Pratt (1882–1966), U.S. Army Major General
 Henry Otis Pratt (1838–1931), American lawyer, minister, and Iowa Republican U.S. Representative
 Henry S. Pratt, American football and basketball coach at the University of Cincinnati
 Henry C. Pratt (merchant) (1761–1838), American merchant in Philadelphia

See also
 Harry Pratt (disambiguation)